PlayStation is a gaming brand of home video game consoles and associated products from Sony Interactive Entertainment.

PlayStation may also refer to specific versions of the products:
 PlayStation (console), the first console in the series
 PlayStation (yacht), a catamaran
 Sony Play Station, a cancelled console related to the Super Nintendo Entertainment System that was to use the SNES-CD media format

See also
 Portable Sound Format or PlayStation Sound Format, a ripped soundtrack from PlayStation games
 Nintendo PlayStation, a cancelled hybrid console designed to play Super Nintendo Entertainment System games, as well as a CD-ROM format named Super Disc
 PlayStation 2 (PS2)
 PlayStation 3 (PS3)
 PlayStation 4 (PS4)
 PlayStation 5 (PS5)
 PlayStation Classic, a miniaturized PS1 dedicated console with 20 included games
 PlayStation Portable (PSP)
 PlayStation Vita, a successor to the PSP
 PSX (video game console), a PlayStation 2-based digital video recorder
 PlayStation Productions, a film production division